Schelde-Dender-Leie was a Belgian post-WW II cycling race organized for the last time in 1965. 

Aalst was both start and finish place. The course, variating between 165 and 252 km, was situated in the valleys of the rivers Scheldt, Dender and Lys.

Winners

References 

Cycle races in Belgium
1947 establishments in Belgium
Defunct cycling races in Belgium
Recurring sporting events established in 1947
Recurring sporting events disestablished in 1965
1965 disestablishments in Belgium